Virtsu is a small borough in Lääneranna Parish, Pärnu County, Estonia. It lies on the western coast of continental Estonia, and is a location of the main port for traffic to and from Saaremaa, the largest island of Estonia.  The Virtsu ferry goes to Kuivastu, which is located on the island of Muhu, which is in turn connected to Saaremaa by the largest causeway in Estonia, the Väinatamm.

As of the 2011 Census, the settlement's population was 539.

Puhtu peninsula, a former island, belongs to Virtsu.

In popular culture
Virtsu (referred to by earlier names Werder and Wirtsu) is described by English adventurer-writer Arthur Ransome in his nautical yarn Racundra's First Cruise.

Climate

Gallery

References

Boroughs and small boroughs in Estonia
Peninsulas of Estonia
Castles of the Teutonic Knights